Z-DNA binding protein 1, also known as Zuotin, is a Saccharomyces cerevisiae yeast gene.

Zuo1 has been identified in vitro as a tRNA and Z-DNA binding protein. The name "zuotin" is derived from the Chinese word "zuo" meaning "left". It is a member of Hsp40 family. Like all other Hsp40 members it also contains a classic J domain.

Zuotin and related proteins contain a unique Zuotin homology domain (ZHD). It associates with the Hsp70 family Ssz1 to form a ribosome associated complex (RAC). In such a complex, the N-terminal domains (including the J domain) associates with Ssz1p on the surface of the large (60S) ribosomal subunit. ZHD provides further contacts with the 60S subunit and connects to a subunit-spanning medium domain (MD), the "neck" of RAC. The four-helix-bundle RAC head domain is located at the C-terminus and binds the small (40S) subunit. The J domain-Ssz1p complex, located over the peptide exit tunnel of the large ribosomal subunit, helps the nascent peptide fold.

References 

Saccharomyces cerevisiae genes
DNA-binding proteins